The Unparty was a political party in Ontario, Canada, in the early 1980s.

In 1980, some former members of the Ontario Libertarian Party left the party because of fundamental disagreements and founded the Unparty. They included Lisa Butler, former OLP chair Mary Lou Gutscher, Bill McDonald, and Paul Wakfer, past-president of the Libertarian Party of Canada (LPC) who had spent many months of his time and considerable money to get the LPC registered by running 50 federal candidates, and who was expelled from the LPC. A major reason for its founding was that the founders had become market anarchist by that time in their libertarian thinking, and decided that the only ethical political action was to seek to abolish the offices of the State. Therefore, the major thrust of the Unparty (and the reason for the name) was that any of its candidates that were elected would refuse to take their salary and would do nothing but vote against all legislation to expand or maintain the State.

The party was based in Toronto, and collected the required voter signatures to register the Unparty in Ontario and in Alberta, and to qualify as a provincial party in New Brunswick. Successful public campaigns were run by Unparty members, attracting national news coverage. These included a protest against the census and a highly publicized defence of property rights with Unparty members attempting to prevent the government's forced demolition of a private home (the official reason for the government's actions was that the owner had not acquired a building permit for renovations made to his property. According to the Unparty, this action, although legal, was unjust).

Counter to most political parties, the Unparty was founded more like a partnership than a democracy, based on the premise that the members were customers who would continue their support so long as progress was being made, and that it was up to the leadership of the executive to provide that value, albeit with input from the members. This organizational structure, along with the official registration status of the Unparty in Ontario, was what appealed to the leaders of the Unparty's London Constituency Associations, which had been the most active and most visible of the Unparty groups outside of the head office itself.

The Unparty founders retired in 1983 and leaders of the London Constituency Association took over the running of the party under a new name and a revised Statement of Purpose as the Freedom Party of Ontario.

References 

Defunct provincial political parties in Ontario
Defunct political parties in Canada
Political parties established in 1980
1980 establishments in Ontario
1983 disestablishments in Ontario
Political parties disestablished in 1983
Anarcho-capitalism
Objectivist organizations